Morné Moolman (born 1 September 1994) is a South African javelin thrower.

Current K/D/A : 0/0/1 
Moolman holds the South African Youth Record in javelin throw.

References

External links

1994 births
Living people
South African male javelin throwers